Sawiris Foundation for Social Development (Arabic: مؤسسة ساويرس للتنمية الإجتماعية) is an Egyptian charity organization linked with the Sawiris Family established in 2001 and a prominent institution of economic and social aid in Egypt.

Its activities include:
Creating projects that provide job opportunities for Egyptians 
Training particularly in economic sectors and professions that are not adequately available in the Egyptian market
Placement of qualified Egyptians in the job market
Scholarships in various colleges and universities with particular programs for scholarships at Queen Mary at University of London and at ETH Zurich.

Since 2005, the foundation also distributes annual literary prizes under the name Sawiris Foundation Awards for Egyptian Literature (in Arabic جائزة مؤسسة ساويرس للأدب المصري) in novels, story collections, short stories, best scenario on long feature movies, best first-time scenario written for cinema. Among the recent winners is novelist Reem Bassiouney.

References

External links
Sawiris Foundation Official website

Charities based in Egypt
Foundations based in Egypt
Organizations established in 2001
2001 establishments in Egypt